The fat tiger (Parantica rotundata) is a species of nymphalid butterfly in the Danainae subfamily. It is endemic to Papua New Guinea.

References

Parantica
Lepidoptera of Papua New Guinea
Butterflies described in 1890
Taxonomy articles created by Polbot